The Technical University of Cluj-Napoca (UTCN short for ) is a public university located in Cluj-Napoca, Romania. It was founded in 1948, based on the older Industrial College (1920). The Technical University of Cluj-Napoca is classified by the Ministry of Education as an advanced research and education university. The university is a member of the Romanian Alliance of Technical Universities (ARUT).

History
In 1948, under the provisions of the August 1948 law for the reform of education, the Cluj Institute of Mechanics was founded. The Institute had a faculty with two departments: Thermotechnics and Machines. The increasing need of technical specialists helped the Mechanics Institute turn into the Polytechnic Institute of Cluj, in 1953.

In 1992 the Polytechnic Institute was renamed as the Technical University of Cluj-Napoca. In 2012, by an university agreement, UTCN absorbed the North University of Baia Mare, which became Baia Mare University North Center of Technical University of Cluj-Napoca

Faculties 
The university has twelve faculties:
 Faculty of Architecture and Urban Planning
 Faculty of Automation and Computer Science
 Faculty of Automotive, Mechatronics and Mechanical Engineering
 Faculty of Civil Engineering
 Faculty of Electronics, Telecommunications and Information Technology
 Faculty of Materials and Environmental Engineering
 Faculty of Building Services Engineering
 Faculty of Electrical Engineering
 Faculty of Industrial Engineering, Robotics and Production Management
 Faculty of Engineering (in Baia Mare)
 Faculty of Letters (in Baia Mare)
 Faculty of Science (in Baia Mare)

Leadership 

As in the case of all universities in Romania, the Technical University of Cluj-Napoca is headed by an elected Senate, representing the academic staff and the students. The Senate elects its Standing Bureau, consisting of the Rector, Prorectors, and Chancellor. The following table presents the members of the Standing Bureau of the Senate of the Technical University of Cluj-Napoca as of October 2009. The Senate has 67 members, including the Standing Bureau.
The Senate also elects the Academic Council. As of 24 June 2008, it consisted of 20 members; the president of the council is Nicolae Burnete.

Facilities 
UTCN is the second largest university in the city of Cluj-Napoca. The university buildings are spread across the city. The university has two student housing areas:
 Complexul Studențesc Observator
 Complexul Studențesc Mǎrǎști

Student organisations
In the Technical University of Cluj-Napoca there are more student organisations: OSSIM (Organizatia Studentilor de la Stiinta si Ingineria Materialelor si Mediului ), the OSUT (Organizaţia Studenților din Universitatea Tehnică), ASCUT (Asociația Studenților Constructori din Universitatea Tehnică), BEST (Board of European Students of Technology) and a couple smaller ones, Green Club, LSPV.

International relations
The Technical University of Cluj-Napoca is one of eight holders of the European University of Technology, EUt+, together with the Technical University, Sofia (Bulgaria), the Cyprus University of Technology (Cyprus), the Darmstadt University of Applied Sciences (Germany), the Technological University Dublin (Ireland), the Riga Technical University (Latvia), the Polytechnic University of Cartagena (Spain), and the University of Technology of Troyes (France). The European University of Technology, EUt+ is the result of the alliance of eight European partners who share in common:
 The "Think Human First" vision towards a human-centred approach to technology.
 The ambition to establish a new type of institution on a confederal basis.
Through EUt+, the partners are committed to creating a sustainable future for students and learners in European countries, for the staff of each of the institutions and for the territories and regions where each campus is anchored.

References

External links

The official web-site, in Romanian and English
OSUT official site
BEST Cluj-Napoca official site
BEST official site
Live images from Cluj-Napoca, from the top of a UTC-N building
Student counseling center UTC-N Escouniv

Educational institutions established in 1948
Universities in Cluj-Napoca
Engineering universities and colleges in Romania
Technical universities and colleges in Romania
1948 establishments in Romania